Lécluse is a commune in the Nord department in northern France.

Geography
The river Sensée flows through Lécluse.

Heraldry

See also
Communes of the Nord department

References

Communes of Nord (French department)
French Flanders